Il Kal Grande, also spelled Il Kal Grandi (Judaeo-Spanish: The Great Synagogue) was the place of worship of the Sephardi community in Sarajevo, Bosnia and Herzegovina. 

The large synagogue was constructed in the Moorish Revival style in 1930, by a design of the architect Rudolf Lubinski. It was acknowledged as the largest and most ornate synagogue in the Balkans. It was heavily damaged by the Nazis in 1941 during World War II, and the majority of the Jewish community killed in the Holocaust. 

After the war, all Jews of Sarajevo used synagogue of the Ashkenazi community. 

The exterior of "Il Kal Grande" was restored in a simplified secular form in 1965, and the former dome was replaced with a flat roof. The building was initially used as the Đuro Đaković Workers' University and currently as the Bosnian Cultural Center.

See also
 Jews in Bosnia and Herzegovina
 Sarajevo Haggadah

References

External links 
 Sarajevo´s synagogues, riowang.blogspot.com

Sephardi Jewish culture in Bosnia and Herzegovina
Sephardi synagogues
Synagogues in Bosnia and Herzegovina
Buildings and structures in Sarajevo
Synagogues completed in 1930
Moorish Revival synagogues
National Monuments of Bosnia and Herzegovina
Religious buildings and structures in Sarajevo
Synagogue buildings with domes
Synagogues destroyed by Nazi Germany